is a former Japanese singer, songwriter, actor and tarento. He was a member of the boy band Sexy Zone.

Early life 
Marius Yo was born on March 30, 2000. His father is German and his mother, Eri Yo (stage name: Akira Yo), is a former Takarazuka Revue actress of Taiwanese Japanese descent. He has two older siblings, Marilena and Max.

Career 

Yo joined Johnny & Associates in January 2011 and debuted together with Kento Nakajima, Fuma Kikuchi, Shori Sato, and So Matsushima as the youngest member of idol group Sexy Zone in November 2011. He was the youngest to ever debut out of the Johnnys & Associates (Age 11 when debuted). In 2012, he debuted as an actor in the Japanese drama Kodomo Keisatsu.

On May 5, 2014, during "Sexy Zone Spring Tour Sexy Second Concert" in Yokohama Arena, it was announced that Sexy Zone's spin-off units, Sexy Boyz and Sexy Show, would be established, with Yo and Matsushima as the respective leaders. The two other members of Sexy Boyz are Yuta Jinguji and Genki Iwahashi, while Sexy Show also consists of Kaito Matsukura and Genta Matsuda. Yo continues to work as a member of both Sexy Zone and Sexy Boyz. In 2015 for their tenth single, Marius became a part of Sexy Zone again, disbanding the unit Sexy Boyz.

On December 2, 2020, it was announced that Marius is on hiatus due to ill health.

On December 27, 2022 it was announced that Marius would be graduating from Sexy Zone and retiring from the entertainment industry following December 31, 2022.

On December 31, 2022, during Johnny & Associates's annual countdown event "Johnny's Countdown 2022-2023", he performed with Sexy Zone for the final time and retired from the entertainment industry.

Appearances 
For Sexy Zone-related appearances, see Sexy Zone.

TV dramas
 Kodomo Keisatsu (TBS, 2012) Seishiro Hazama
 Kodomo Keishi (TBS, 2013) Seishiro Hazama (voice over by Mamoru Miyano)
 Akumu-chan Special (NTV, 2014) Yume no Oji

TV comedies
Fuller House (Netflix 2017) As Himself

Movies
 Kodomo Keisatsu (2013, Toho), Seishiro Hazama
 Akumu-chan the Movie (2014), Yume no Oji/Shibui Kanji

TV variety programs
 Johnny's Jr. Land (BS SKY, October 2, 2011 – 2012) 
 Bakusho Gakuen Nasebanaru! (TBS, October 9, 2012 - February 26, 2013)

Concerts
 Live House Johnny's Ginza 2013 with So Matsushima and Johnny's Jr (Theater Crea Ginza, May, 2013)
 Gamushara Sexy Summer festival!! (ガムシャラSexy夏祭り!!) (EX Theater Roppongi, July 30 - August 10, 2014)
 A.B.C-Z's "Summer Concert 2014 A.B.C-Z "Legend" (Yoyogi National First Gymnasium, September 14–15, 2014 ), Special Guest
 Live House Johnny's Ginza 2015 with Johnny's Jr (Theater Crea Ginza, May 8–10,17, 2015)
 Gamushara! Summer Station (ガムシャラ！サマーステーション) (EX Theater Roppongi, July 23 - August 19, 2015)
 Johnnys' Summer Paradise 2016 Hey So! Hey Yo! ~summertime memory~ (Tokyo Dome City Hall, August 7–9, 2016)
 Summer Paradise 2017 So what? Yolo! (Tokyo Dome City Hall, August 17–20, 2017)

Stage Performances
 JOHNNYS’ World (Imperial Theater Tokyo, November 10 - December 30, 2012)
 Hello Kitty Adventures in Wonderland (Sanrio Puroland, April 20, 2013) Kyle (voice)
 2015 Shinshun JOHNNYS' World (Imperial Theater Tokyo, January 1–27, 2015)
 DREAM BOYS (Imperial Theater Tokyo, September 12–14&18-20, 2015)
 Shonentachi Kiki Ippatsu! (Nissay Theater Tokyo, September 4–28, 2016) (Special Appearance)

CM
 ORANGINA (Suntory, March 2017)

Ambassador
 Otsuka Museum of Art Holiday at the Museum campaign (November 3, 2018 - May 2, 2019)

Solo songs

References 

2000 births
Living people
Johnny & Associates
Japanese idols
Japanese male child actors
Japanese child singers
Japanese people of Chinese descent
21st-century Japanese male actors
Japanese male pop singers
21st-century Japanese singers
21st-century Japanese male singers